The 2021 NCAA Division I baseball tournament was the 74th edition of the NCAA Division I Baseball Championship. The 64-team tournament began on Friday, June 4, 2021, as part of the 2021 NCAA Division I baseball season and concluded with the 2021 College World Series in Omaha, Nebraska, which started on June 19 and ended on June 30. Mississippi State defeated Vanderbilt in the best-of-three final series to win their first national championship in program history.

The 64 participating NCAA Division I college baseball teams were selected out of an eligible 299 teams. There were 30 teams awarded an automatic bid as champions of their conferences, and 34 teams were selected at-large by the NCAA Division I Baseball Committee. Teams were divided into sixteen regionals of four teams, each of which conducted a double-elimination tournament. Regional champions then faced each other in Super Regionals, a best-of-three game series, to determine the eight participants in the College World Series.

Grand Canyon, NJIT, Norfolk State and Presbyterian made their NCAA tournament debuts after winning their first conference tournaments in program history. Nevada qualified for the tournament for the first time since 2000, Rider qualified for the first time since 2010 and Charlotte qualified for the first time since 2011. Auburn and Louisville were the lone teams from the 2019 College World Series field to fail to qualify.

Tournament procedure 
A total of 64 teams entered the tournament, with 30 of them (down from 31, due to the Ivy League having cancelled all spring sports due to COVID-19) receiving an automatic bid by winning their conference's tournament. The remaining 34 bids were at-large", with selections extended by the NCAA Selection Committee.

On Friday, May 14, the NCAA Selection Committee announced 20 potential sites for the first round regionals due to necessary coronavirus precautions, which were reduced to 16 on May 30. Typically, the top sixteen teams receive national seeds and host their respective regional tournaments. However, since the committee determined only twenty potential sites, if a team outside that list of twenty were to receive a national seed, they would play their regional on the road. This had not occurred since 2010 when No. 1 seed Florida State Seminoles traveled to the Norwich Regional hosted by UConn at Dodd Memorial Stadium. Despite receiving a national seed, Old Dominion travelled to Founders Park at the Columbia Regional hosted by the University of South Carolina.

Schedule and venues 
On May 30, the NCAA Division I Baseball Committee announced the sixteen regional host sites. The Southeastern Conference led the way with seven hosts. The Big 12 Conference and Pac-12 Conference each had three regional hosts, while Conference USA, Atlantic Coast Conference, and American Athletic Conference each had one regional host. Texas led all institutions as they hosted for the 28th time. Louisiana Tech hosted for the first time in program history.

The Super Regional sites were announced on the morning of Tuesday, June 8, after the completion of the regional round.

Regionals
June 4–7
UFCU Disch–Falk Field, Austin, Texas, (Host: University of Texas at Austin)
Founders Park, Columbia, South Carolina, (Host: University of South Carolina)
PK Park, Eugene, Oregon (Host: University of Oregon)
Baum–Walker Stadium, Fayetteville, Arkansas (Host: University of Arkansas)
Lupton Stadium, Fort Worth, Texas, (Host: Texas Christian University)
Florida Ballpark, Gainesville, Florida, (Host: University of Florida)
Clark–LeClair Stadium, Greenville, North Carolina, (Host: East Carolina University)
Lindsey Nelson Stadium, Knoxville, Tennessee, (Host: University of Tennessee)
Dan Law Field at Rip Griffin Park, Lubbock, Texas, (Host: Texas Tech University)
Hawkins Field, Nashville, Tennessee, (Host: Vanderbilt University)
Swayze Field, Oxford, Mississippi, (Host: University of Mississippi)
J. C. Love Field at Pat Patterson Park, Ruston, Louisiana, (Host: Louisiana Tech University)
Frank Eck Stadium, South Bend, Indiana (Host: University of Notre Dame)
Klein Field at Sunken Diamond, Stanford, California (Host: Stanford University)
Dudy Noble Field, Polk–DeMent Stadium, Starkville, Mississippi, (Host: Mississippi State University)
Hi Corbett Field, Tucson, Arizona (Host: University of Arizona)

Super Regionals
June 11–13
Baum–Walker Stadium, Fayetteville, Arkansas (Host: University of Arkansas)
Dan Law Field at Rip Griffin Park, Lubbock, Texas (Host: Texas Tech University)
Hi Corbett Field, Tucson, Arizona (Host: University of Arizona)
Hawkins Field, Nashville, Tennessee (Host: Vanderbilt University)
June 12–14
UFCU Disch–Falk Field, Austin, Texas (Host: University of Texas at Austin)
Dudy Noble Field, Polk–DeMent Stadium, Starkville, Mississippi (Host: Mississippi State University)
Founders Park, Columbia, South Carolina (Host: University of South Carolina)
Lindsey Nelson Stadium, Knoxville, Tennessee (Host: University of Tennessee)

College World Series
June 19–30
TD Ameritrade Park Omaha, Omaha, Nebraska, (Host: Creighton University)

Bids
Of the 64 qualified to play in the 2021 NCAA Division I Baseball Tournament, 35 competed in the previous tournament in 2019. Grand Canyon, NJIT, Norfolk State and Presbyterian all made their NCAA tournament debuts after winning their first conference tournaments in program history. Nevada qualified for the tournament for the first time since 2000, Rider qualified for the first time since 2010 and Charlotte qualified for the first time since 2011.

Notable teams that failed to qualify included Auburn and Louisville, who both advanced to the 2019 College World Series.

By conference

National seeds
The sixteen national seeds were announced on the Selection Show on Monday, May 31 at 12 p.m. EDT on ESPN2. Teams in italics advanced to the Super Regionals. Teams in bold advanced to the 2021 College World Series.

 Arkansas
 Texas
 Tennessee
 Vanderbilt
 Arizona
 TCU
 Mississippi State
 Texas Tech
 Stanford
 Notre Dame
 Old Dominion
 Ole Miss
 East Carolina
 
 Florida
 Louisiana Tech

Regionals and Super Regionals

Bold indicates winner. Seeds for regional tournaments indicate seeds within regional.  Seeds for super regional tournaments indicate national seeds only.

Fayetteville Super Regional

Lubbock Super Regional

Tucson Super Regional

Nashville Super Regional

Knoxville Super Regional

Columbia Super Regional
The Columbia Super Regional between Dallas Baptist and Virginia was held at Founders Park due to NCAA COVID-19 guidelines for the 2021 tournament mandating that all Super Regionals take place at one of the original sixteen regional sites regardless of the winners of those regionals.

†Old Dominion was unable to host at their home stadium, Bud Metheny Baseball Complex in Norfolk, Virginia, due to inadequate facilities according to NCAA regional hosting guidelines.

Starkville Super Regional

Austin Super Regional

College World Series

The College World Series was held at TD Ameritrade Park Omaha in Omaha, Nebraska.

Bracket

Bracket 1

Bracket 2

Finals
Game 1

Game 2

Game 3

Awards
The 2021 College World Series Most Outstanding Player was pitcher Will Bednar of Mississippi. In addition to the Most Outstanding Player, an All-Tournament team was selected for the College World Series.

All-CWS Team

Final standings
Seeds listed below indicate national seeds only

Record by conference 

 Includes a game declared no-contest due to COVID-19 protocols with NC State. Vanderbilt advanced to the CWS Finals.

The columns RF, SR, WS, NS, CS, and NC respectively stand for the Regional Finals, Super Regionals, College World Series Teams, National Semifinals, Championship Series, and National Champion.

Nc is non–conference records, i.e., with the records of teams within the same conference having played each other removed.

Media coverage

Radio
NRG Media will provide nationwide radio coverage of the College World Series through its Omaha Station KOZN, in association with Westwood One. It also will stream all CWS games at westwoodonesports.com on Tunein and on SiriusXM. Kevin Kugler and John Bishop will provide pxp on games leading up to the Championship Series. Bishop (Gms 6, 8-10, 12), Jeff Leise (Gms 2, 4-5), Damon Benning (Gms 1, 3, 7, 11), and Gary Sharp (Gms 13-14) will provide the analysis. The Championship Series will be called by Kugler and Scott Graham.

Television
ESPN will air every game from the Regionals, Super Regionals, and the College World Series across its networks.

Broadcast assignments
Regionals

Bob Wischusen and Gregg Olson: Austin, Texas
Mike Monaco and Gaby Sánchez: Columbia, South Carolina
Clay Matvick and Ben McDonald: Eugene, Oregon
Steve Lenox and Lance Cormier: Fayetteville, Arkansas
Anish Shroff and Keith Moreland: Fort Worth, Texas
Jon Meterparel and Nick Belmonte: Gainesville, Florida
Chris Cotter and Danan Hughes: Greenville, North Carolina
Mark Neely and Adam Greenberg: Knoxville, Tennessee

Dave Neal and Chris Burke: Lubbock, Texas
Mike Couzens and Greg Swindell: Nashville, Tennessee
Tom Hart and Kyle Peterson: Oxford, Mississippi
Sam Ravech and Roddy Jones: Ruston, Louisiana
Mike Morgan and Todd Walker: South Bend, Indiana
John Schriffen and Xavier Scruggs: Stanford, California
Roy Philpott and Jay Walker: Starkville, Mississippi
Roxy Bernstein and Wes Clements: Tucson, Arizona

Super Regionals

Mike Monaco and Eduardo Pérez: Austin, Texas
John Schriffen and Gaby Sánchez: Columbia, South Carolina
Mike Morgan and Todd Walker: Fayetteville, Arkansas
Tom Hart and Chris Burke: Knoxville, Tennessee

Karl Ravech and Mike Rooney: Lubbock, Texas
Clay Matvick and Ben McDonald: Nashville, Tennessee
Dave Neal and Kyle Peterson: Starkville, Mississippi
Roxy Bernstein and Wes Clements: Tucson, Arizona

College World Series

Tom Hart, Chris Burke, Ben McDonald, and Kris Budden: Afternoons, Thursday night

Karl Ravech, Eduardo Pérez, Kyle Peterson, and Kris Budden: Evenings minus Thursday

CWS Championship Series

Karl Ravech, Eduardo Pérez, Kyle Peterson, and Kris Budden

Notes

References

External links
Official Bracket at NCAA.com

 
Tournament
NCAA Division I baseball tournament
NCAA Division I Baseball Championship